My Past is a 1931 American Pre-Code drama film directed by Roy Del Ruth and starring Bebe Daniels. It was produced and distributed by Warner Bros. and was also known under the alternative title The Ex-Mistress.

Plot summary
Broadway star Doree Macy is being simultaneously wooed by two men who happen to be business partners: older John Thornley and younger (and married) Robert Byrne (played by Daniels' real-life husband, Ben Lyon). Which, if either, will wind up with her heart?

Cast
 Bebe Daniels as Miss Doree Macy
 Lewis Stone as Mr. John Thornley
 Ben Lyon as Robert "Bob" Byrne
 Joan Blondell as Marion Moore
 Natalie Moorhead as Consuelo "Connie" Byrne
 Albert Gran as Lionel Reich
 Virginia Sale as Miss Taft, Thornley's secretary

Preservation status
A surviving print is preserved in the collection of the Library of Congress. It is also available on DVD from Warner Archive and airs occasionally on Turner Classic Movies.

References

External links
 
 
 
 
  film poster(Listal)

1931 films
1931 romantic drama films
American romantic drama films
American black-and-white films
1930s English-language films
Films directed by Roy Del Ruth
Warner Bros. films
1930s American films